Saman Arastoo (born Farzaneh Arastoo on 5 June 1967 in Shahrud, Iran) is an Iranian actor and director. He starred in the 2003 drama Abadan prior to gender transition, and directs plays regarding the acceptance of transgender people in Iranian society. His play Khodkar-é-Bikar (Useless Pen) features transgender characters played by transgender actors.

Personal life 
Arastoo describes his first marriage in 1991 as a "forced marriage" for which the divorce lasted one and a half years. He underwent sex reassignment surgeries at age 42 in 2008. He married again in 2015. Following wide publicity around his gender transition, Arastoo has been a public figure for the Iranian transgender community, including holding drama therapy workshops such as "Self Cognition".

Career 
He founded the Avaye Divanegan Theatre Group in 1983.

Filmography

References

External links 
 

1967 births
Living people
People from Shahrud, Iran
21st-century Iranian actors
Transgender male actors
Iranian LGBT artists